Henry Pearson may refer to:

Henry C. Pearson (1914–2006), American painter
Henry Harold Welch Pearson (1870–1916), British-born South African botanist
Henry Hugh Pearson (1815–1873), English composer
Henry John Pearson (1850–1913), British ornithologist and explorer of the European Arctic
Henry Shepherd Pearson (c.1775–1840), acting Governor of Penang

See also
Harry Pearson (disambiguation)